is a village located in Nagano Prefecture, Japan. , the village had an estimated population of 4,468, and a population density of 45.8 persons per km².

Geography
Kijimadaira is located in mountainous northeastern Nagano Prefecture.

Surrounding municipalities
Nagano Prefecture
 Iiyama
 Nozawaonsen
 Yamanouchi
Sakae
Tsumagoi
Nakanojō

Climate
The village has a humid continental climate characterized by warm and humid summers, and cold winters with heavy snowfall (Köppen climate classification Dfb). The average annual temperature in Kijimadaira is 7.3 °C. The average annual rainfall is 1570 mm with September as the wettest month. The temperatures are highest on average in August, at around 20.3 °C, and lowest in January, at around -5.1 °C.

Demographics 
Per Japanese census data, the population of Kijimadaira has decreased over the past 70 years.

History
The area of present-day Kijimadaira was part of ancient Shinano Province. The modern village of Kijimadaira was established on February 1, 1955 by the merger of the villages of Hotada, Ogo and Kamijijima. A proposal to merge the village with neighboring Iiyama city and Nozawaonsen village was overwhelmingly rejected by local inhabitants in 2004.

Economy
The economy of Kijimadaira is based on agriculture and seasonal tourism.

Education
Kijimadaira has one public elementary school and one public middle school operated by the village government. The village has one public high school operated by the Nagano Prefectural Board of Education.

Transportation

Railway
The village has no passenger railway service.

Highway

References

External links

Official Website 

 
Villages in Nagano Prefecture